The Borough of Boston is a local government district with borough status in Lincolnshire, England. Its council is based in the town of Boston. The borough covers a wider area that includes villages such as Wyberton, Butterwick, Kirton-in-Holland, Langrick Bridge, Sutterton, Swineshead, Old Leake, Fosdyke, Kirton Holme and Hubberts Bridge.

The borough borders East Lindsey to the north, North Kesteven to the west and South Holland to the south. To the east is The Wash.

At the 2011 census, the population of the borough was 64,637.

History
The borough was formed on 1 April 1974 by the merger of the former borough of Boston with Boston Rural District.

Until 1974, Lincolnshire comprised three Parts, somewhat like the Ridings of Yorkshire. These were the Parts of Lindsey, Kesteven and Holland. In their final form, they were each, in effect, an administrative county. The 1974 changes divided the Parts of Holland into two districts; the Borough of Boston is the northern one.

Management
Summary of the Council's organisation.
Day to day management
Key to descriptions of council services.

Political composition
The political composition of the council following the elections in May 2015 and May 2019 are as follows:

In 2015 no party had a majority, but the Conservatives had minority control. In 2019 the Conservatives won a clear majority of seats.

Election results
For full election results see: Boston local elections.

Electoral arrangements
The Borough is divided into fifteen electoral wards covering both the town of Boston and surrounding rural areas. The boundaries were redrawn in 2013 and used in borough elections since 2015. The wards are listed below, showing the number of councillors elected by each:

Coastal: 2;
Fenside: 2;
Fishtoft: 3;
Five Villages: 2;
Kirton and Frampton: 3;
Old Leake and Wrangle: 2;
Skirbeck: 3;
St Thomas': 1;
Staniland: 2;
Station: 1;
Swineshead and Holland Fen: 2;
Trinity: 2;
West: 1;
Witham: 2;
Wyberton: 2.

2016 EU referendum

On 23 June 2016 the Borough of Boston voted in the UK-wide Referendum on membership of the European Union (EU) under the provisions of the European Union Referendum Act 2015. In a turnout of 77%, over 75% voted to leave the EU, the highest leave majority of the 382 UK voting areas. The local MP Matt Warman, a Conservative, had campaigned for a "Remain" vote.

Freedom of the Borough
The following people and military units have received the Freedom of the Borough of Boston.

Individuals
 Professor Sir Jonathan Van-Tam: 21 March 2022.

Military Units
 RAF Coningsby: 16 May 1963.

In the media 
In May 2020, East Lindsey district council and Boston borough council announced proposals to merge gradually over 10 years, with the intention of saving taxpayers £15.4m.  However, in June 2020, Lincolnshire Live newspaper reported the "anger" after a vote on the proposals due to be put to councillors was cancelled as Boston borough council leader, Paul Skinner, expected the plans would likely be rejected.  He told the newspaper "The motion was withdrawn because some people were making it known that they might vote against it".

In October 2020, Private Eye reported the outgoing chief executive, Phil Drury, received a £443,998 exit payment and compared it to a £440,000 payment made to the London Borough of Croydon's then new chief executive, Jo Negrini.

Arms

References

External links

 
Non-metropolitan districts of Lincolnshire
Local government districts of the East Midlands
Boroughs in England